was a composer, ukulele player and steel guitarist. He and his brother Katsuhiko Haida founded the Nihon Ukulele Association.

Early life and education 
Haida was born in Honolulu on 24 April 1909, to parents who were Japanese immigrants to Hawaii. In 1923, while in Japan to place his late father's ashes in the family grave, Haida was caught up in the chaos after the 1923 Great Kanto earthquake, during which his family home was burgled and his passport was stolen. He later studied for a while at Chuo University and Keio University, leaving the latter without graduating.

Career 
In 1928 Haida formed formed the Moana Glee Club, a Hawaiian music group, with his younger brother Katsuhiko Haida. The band popularized the ukulele in Japan. In 1933 Haida temporarily returned to Hawaii to study with M.K. Moke.

Haida began writing and arranging songs, and taught guitar in Koenji, Tokyo in 1935. Some of his students included Fumimaro Konoe's daughter and Kaneko Kentaro's grandchild. He signed with Victor Records and began recording and publishing music. During this time, Haida wrote songs like , which became a hit when Katsuhiko sang it. The band was active until World War II, when Western music, including Hawaiian music, were banned in 1943.

After the war Haida and Katsuhiko formed a band called the New Moana. They started the Nihon Ukulele Association in 1959.

In 1979 Haida was honored for his career and achievements at the 21st Japan Record Awards.

References 

1909 births
1986 deaths
20th-century American male musicians
20th-century Japanese male musicians
American emigrants to Japan
American musicians of Japanese descent
Japanese composers
Japanese male composers
People from Honolulu